Maggie's First False Step is a 1917 short film directed by Frank Griffin and Mack Sennett, and starring Charles Murray, Louise Fazenda and Wallace Beery. The short was produced by Sennett at the Keystone Film Company and distributed by Triangle Distributing.  The supporting cast features Alice Davenport and Mary Thurman.

Cast
Charles Murray...	
The Floorwalker
Louise Fazenda	...	
Maggie - the Country Girl
Wallace Beery	...	
The Villain
Harry Booker	...	
Maggie's Father
Alice Davenport	...	
Maggie's Mother
Mary Thurman

External links
  Maggie's First False Step in the Internet Movie Database

1917 films
American black-and-white films
American silent short films
1917 short films
1910s American films
1910s English-language films